John Earl Jacobs (November 29, 1903 – May 24, 1971) was an American educator most notably for serving as an administrator at what is now known as Emporia State University. Before serving as the Kansas State Teachers College (KSTC) interim president of, Jacobs was the Supervisor of Secondary Education at KSTC and served as principal of a couple of high schools before coming to Emporia.

Biography

Early life and education
Jacobs was born on November 29, 1903 in Independence, Kansas. After graduating high school, Jacobs attended KSTC in Pittsburg, now known as Pittsburg State University, Jacobs completed his bachelor of science in 1925, and both his master's and doctorate from the University of Kansas (KU). After graduating with his master's degree, Jacobs was a guest lecturer at the KU, and was later the principal of the university's high school. A few years later after educating in the Burlingame Public Schools, Jacobs became principal of Osawatomie High School. He was principal of Lawrence Junior High School from 1934 to 1941.

Kansas State Teachers College
Jacobs started in 1947 at the KSTC as the Supervisor of Secondary Education and on January 16, 1953, Jacobs became the interim president of KSTC after David L. MacFarlane, the incumbent president, died of heart problems. Jacobs's last day at KSTC was July 31, 1953.

State office
After serving as the interim president of KSTC, Jacobs served as the Director of Special Education, a newly created division at the time, for the Kansas Department of Public Instruction for four years before moving to California. He served that position until his retirement in 1971.

References

External links
 

Presidents of Emporia State University
Emporia State University faculty
Pittsburg State University alumni
University of Kansas alumni
People from Independence, Kansas
1903 births
1971 deaths
20th-century American academics